Khalifan District is in Mahabad County, West Azerbaijan province, Iran. At the 2006 National Census, its population was 17,744 in 2,741 households. The following census in 2011 counted 16,772 people in 3,103 households. At the latest census in 2016, the district had 14,780 inhabitants in 3,667 households.

References 

Mahabad County

Districts of West Azerbaijan Province

Populated places in West Azerbaijan Province

Populated places in Mahabad County